"Munich" is a song by British post-punk revival band Editors and is featured on their 2005 debut album, The Back Room. It was originally released 18 April 2005 as the second single from the band. It was re-released on 2 January 2006, peaking at number 10 in the UK Singles Chart. It finished as the 184th best-selling single in the UK, in 2006.

Composition
"Munich" is composed in the key of G minor with a tempo of 150 beats per minute.

In popular culture
It is featured on the soundtrack to the video games Saints Row, FIFA Street 2 and Major League Baseball 2K7. The song is played when the guests are being introduced on the English television programme A Question of Sport. It also appeared on the third season finale of Cold Case and in various episodes of the BBC drama Waterloo Road. It is featured in the 2008 film One Missed Call. "Munich" alone comes as a free pack-in song on every Zune player bought.

Track listings 
All songs written and composed by Chris Urbanowicz, Edward Lay, Russell Leetch and Tom Smith, except where noted.

Original release

7" vinyl
 UK: Kitchenware SKX78 (limited to 3000 copies)

CD
 UK: Kitchenware SKCD78 (limited to 3000 copies)

 UK: Kitchenware SKCD78-2

Re-release

7" vinyl
 UK: Kitchenware SKX83

CD
 UK: Kitchenware SKCD83

 UK: Kitchenware SKCD832

Charts

Weekly charts

Year-end charts

Certifications

Cover versions

 "Munich" was covered by Corinne Bailey Rae for Jo Whiley's BBC Radio 1 in 2006 and featured on Radio 1's Live Lounge.
 A version by R.E.M., also for BBC Radio 1, was released on Radio 1's Live Lounge – Volume 3 in 2008.

References

2005 songs
2005 singles
2006 singles
Editors (band) songs
Corinne Bailey Rae songs
Song recordings produced by Jim Abbiss
Songs written by Russell Leetch
Songs written by Tom Smith (musician)
Songs written by Edward Lay
Songs written by Chris Urbanowicz